At the Devil's Door (originally titled Home) is a 2014 American supernatural horror film directed by Nicholas McCarthy. The film had its world premiere on March 9, 2014, at South by Southwest. It stars Naya Rivera as a woman caught amidst ghostly events.

Plot
A teenage girl Hannah (Ashley Rickards) is told by her new boyfriend that she can get $500 by playing a game run by an old man living in a trailer. After she wins the game, the old man (Michael Massee) instructs her to go to the crossroads and say her name so that "he" will know whom to take. At home later that night, the girl hears voices before being lifted into the air.

A real estate agent Leigh (Catalina Sandino Moreno) is trying to sell the home of Chuck (Dan Roebuck) and Royanna (Jan Broberg). While going over the various details of the couple's property, Leigh mentions that she saw a young girl inside their home. The couple assume that Leigh saw their missing daughter, Charlene, who ran away with her boyfriend several months earlier.

When Leigh goes back to the couple's house she finds "Charlene." Leigh calls Chuck to let him know that she found Charlene; however, Chuck tells Leigh that police found his daughter at a local mall hours ago. Puzzled, Leigh looks at the files from the couple's home and finds an article with "Charlene's" picture in it. Leigh realizes that the girl she had seen was actually Hannah White, a girl who had committed suicide in 1987. Leigh notices Hannah is missing and tries to look for her in the house. She finds Hannah in an empty room staring into a mirror. When Leigh tries to speak with Hannah, she is attacked by some unseen force, falls to the floor, and dies.

The coroner tells Leigh's sister Vera (Naya Rivera) that she died of natural causes. Later in Leigh's home, Vera finds Leigh's files from the couple's house and visits Hannah's old childhood friend. Hannah's friend reveals that Hannah had been pregnant before she died. Many people believed that Hannah had committed suicide because of her pregnancy. However, Hannah's friend insists that Hannah had been a virgin, and that she may have killed herself to stop her supernatural child from being born. Since Hannah had killed herself, the demon that had tried to possess her child instead took over her body until it could find another vessel.

Vera returns to her home, where she is assaulted by a demonic force that throws her through a window to fall two stories. Vera wakes up in a hospital; she has been in a coma for eight months. The doctor tells her she was pregnant when it happened. During her ultrasound, Vera sees a demonic face on the monitor and demands an immediate C-section.

Six years later, Vera visits her daughter, who has been adopted by another woman. Vera tells the girl that she knows who the little girl really is and demands to know why she was chosen. The girl flees. Vera chases her to an abandoned house in the woods and attempts to kill her. Unable to do so, Vera leaves, taking her daughter with her.

Cast
Naya Rivera as Vera
Catalina Sandino Moreno as Leigh
Ashley Rickards as Hannah
Ava Acres as Girl
Michael Massee as Uncle Mike
 Wyatt Russell as Sam
Nick Eversman as Calvin
Tara Buck as Yolanda
Bresha Webb as Becky
Olivia Crocicchia as Charlene
Jennifer Aspen as Lori
Daniel Roebuck as Chuck
 Arshad Aslam as Seth
 Rob Brownstein as Dr. Daninsky
 Laura Kai Chen as Dr. Kim
Assaf Cohen as Dr. Aranda
Kent Faulcon as Davis
Kate Flannery as Rosemary
 Shaun O'Hagan as 
 Mark Steger as Thin Man
 Kelsey Heller as Young Lori

Production
Plans to film At the Devil's Door were first announced in 2012 under the title Home, shortly after the release of McCarthy's 2012 directorial debut The Pact. Filming was completed in January 2013.

Reception
Rotten Tomatoes, a review aggregator, reports that 43% of 23 surveyed critics gave the film a positive review; the average rating was 6.08/10. The website's critics consensus reads: "At the Devil's Door has no shortage of creepy style -- unfortunately, that isn't enough to distract from an uninspired story that never capitalizes on its potential." Metacritic gave it a weighted average score of 47 out of 100, based on 8 critics, indicating "mixed or average reviews".

Writing in Variety, Dennis Harvey stopped short of recommending the film, but praised some aspects of it, stating, "Though disappointing content-wise, McCarthy’s sophomore feature still demonstrates admirable attention to things that usually suffer in more superficially flashy horror efforts, notably credible real-world backgrounding (the nondescript Southern California locations suggest a middle class slipping haplessly toward poverty), naturalistic perfs, and habit of favoring creepy restraint over “gotcha!” moments. (Still, the pic could have used one or two more of the latter.) Tech and design contributions are likewise thoughtful." Alan Scherstuhl wrote a similar review in The Village Voice, writing, "McCarthy shows he's mastered the things we already know scare us onscreen; next, how about something we don't expect?" Fearnet called At the Devil's Door "impressive work" and remarked that "it works as a slick and admirably unpredictable whole, and it somehow seems to work as three distinct chapters as well."

We Got This Covered gave a mixed review, stating that the film was "a bone-chilling ghost story that I'd absolutely love to recommend, but once again I struggled to keep a constant connection to Nicholas McCarthy's befuddling screenplay, packed with exciting ideas and bright moments of sheer terror – but nothing consistently worthwhile." Best Horror Movie's review said, "When you incorporate three extremely powerful performances from three extremely attractive young ladies (Catalina Sandino Moreno as Leigh, Ashley Rickards as Hannah and Naya Rivera as Vera) you've got a very real recipe for success." EFilmCritic.com praised the performances: "They're good enough to make the end more satisfying than it initially appears after things have sunken in a bit, even if the movie does occasionally seem to be setting up something a little more grandiose." Sound on Sight wrote, "Supporting the scares is a strong cast". Frank Scheck of The Hollywood Reporter wrote, "Creepy atmospherics aren't enough to compensate for the muddled storyline."

References

External links
 
 

2014 films
2014 horror films
American supernatural horror films
2010s English-language films
2010s American films